Les Discrets/Arctic Plateau is a split record by les Discrets and Arctic Plateau released in 2011, giving an insight in the artists upcoming releases, Ariettes oubliées... and The Enemy Inside respectively. The artwork was done by Les Discrets' Fursy Teyssier. Arctic Plateau's part also features the demos that led to their contract with Prophecy Records in 2008. "The Persuaders Theme" is a cover of the theme melody for the 1971 TV series the Persuaders!

Track listing
Disc one, les Discrets

Disc two, Arctic Plateau

Personnel
Disc one
 Audrey Hadorn - vocals, lyrics
 Fursy Teyssier - guitars, bass, vocals, cover art
 Winterhalter - drums

Disc two
 Gianluca Divirgilio - Guitars, vocals, lyrics
 Fabio Fraschini - Electric bass
 Massimiliano Chiapperi - Drums

References

2011 EPs
Split EPs
Les Discrets albums
Arctic Plateau albums